Saint-Victor is a commune in the Allier department in Auvergne-Rhône-Alpes in central France.

Population

Sights
 Château de Passat 
 Saint Victor church, 13th century, entirely restored 
 Château de Thizon

See also
 Communes of the Allier department

References

Communes of Allier
Allier communes articles needing translation from French Wikipedia